Małgorzata (Margo) Rejmer, born in 1985 in Warsaw, is a Polish novelist, reporter, and writer of short stories.

Her books, which have been translated into eight languages, include the novel Toximia (2009) and two works of nonfiction: Bucharest: Dust and Blood, which won the Newsweek Award for best book of 2014, the Gryfia Literary Award (2014), and the TVP Kultura Award (2014); and Mud Sweeter than Honey, for which she was awarded the Polityka Passport, the most prestigious prize in Poland for emerging artists, as well as the Arkady Fiedler Award. She holds the title of the Young Ambassador of the Polish Language.

Works
2009: Toksymia. Warsaw, Lampa i Iskra Boża
2013: Bukareszt. Kurz i krew, Warsaw, Wydawnictwo Czarne
2018: Błoto słodsze niż miód, Głosy komunistycznej Albanii, Warsaw, Wydawnictwo Czarne

References 
 

Polish women novelists
Living people
1985 births
21st-century Polish novelists
20th-century Polish women writers
21st-century Polish women writers

University of Warsaw alumni